Skye Patrick is an American librarian who has served as Library Director of LA County Library since February 2016.

Early life and education 
Patrick grew up in Lansing, Michigan where she was partially in foster care. She worked as a library page while in high school and graduated from Northern Michigan University in 1996 with a bachelor of fine arts degree.

While at NMU, she helped create the Ten Percent Club which became the Gay, Lesbian, Bisexual, Transgender, and Intersexed Student Union. Her master’s degree in library and information science is from the University of Pittsburgh.

Earlier library experiences 
Patrick was the Director of Libraries for Broward County, Florida where she was the second African American, the first openly LGBTQ person, and first woman to hold the position. Before that she was Assistant Director of the Queens Public Library and San Francisco Public Library.

Library Director of LA County Library 
Patrick has served as Library Director of LA County Library since February 2016 and is its first African American Director.

As of 2023, the Library Director oversees Los Angeles County's 85 libraries, 1 institutional library, 4 Cultural Resource Centers, and a mobile fleet of MākMō maker mobiles and Bookmobiles which serve 3.5 million people with an annual operating budget of over $200 million.

Under Patrick's tenure, the Library started a fine-forgiveness program where patrons under 21 can "read away" their late fees, resulting in 13,000 previously blocked accounts being reinstated. The Library also eliminated fines for overdue books and materials in August 2021.

In January 2019, Patrick was named Librarian of the Year by Library Journal. The Library also won the Library Journal 2019 Library of the Year award and 2018 Marketer of the Year award, in addition to being named a finalist for the Institute of Museum and Library Services National Medal in 2018 and 2019. 

In October 2020, Patrick accepted the Community Impact Award from Innovate@UCLA, part of UCLA’s annual Executive Leadership Awards.

Personal life 
Patrick serves on the Executive Board of the Urban Libraries Council (ULC) and California Humanities.

References

Living people
American librarians
African-American librarians
Year of birth missing (living people)